Jelena Zanevskaya (born 2 April 1987) is a Lithuanian artistic gymnast who competed at the 2008 Summer Olympics.

References

External links
 
 
 

1987 births
Living people
Lithuanian female artistic gymnasts
Olympic gymnasts of Lithuania
Gymnasts at the 2008 Summer Olympics
Sportspeople from Vilnius